Comin' Your Way is an album by jazz saxophonist Stanley Turrentine recorded for the Blue Note label and performed by Turrentine with his brother Tommy Turrentine, Horace Parlan, George Tucker and Al Harewood. Selections from this album had previously been issued, with additional tracks later appeared as Jubilee Shout!!! (1986), as Jubilee Shouts (1978, BN-LA883-J2).

Reception 

The Allmusic review by Ron Wynn awarded the album 4 stars and calls it "a sumptuous '60s soul-jazz date".

Track listing 
 "My Girl Is Just Enough Woman for Me" (Fields, Hague) - 6:45
 "Then I'll Be Tired of You" (E.Y. "Yip" Harburg, Arthur Schwartz) - 6:09
 "Fine L'il Lass" (Leon Mitchell) - 6:14
 "Fine L'il Lass" [Alternate Take] - 5:52 Bonus track on CD
 "Thomasville" (Tommy Turrentine) - 6:36
 "Someone to Watch Over Me" (Gershwin, Gershwin) - 7:45
 "Stolen Sweets" (Wild Bill Davis) - 6:12
 "Just in Time" (Comden, Green, Styne) - 6:30 Bonus track on CD

Personnel 
 Stanley Turrentine - tenor saxophone
 Tommy Turrentine - trumpet - except track 6
 Horace Parlan - piano
 George Tucker - bass
 Al Harewood - drums

Production 
 Alfred Lion - producer
 Reid Miles - design
 Rudy Van Gelder - engineer
 Francis Wolff - photography

References 

1987 albums
Stanley Turrentine albums
Blue Note Records albums
Albums produced by Alfred Lion
Albums recorded at Van Gelder Studio